Dăești is a commune in Vâlcea County, Muntenia, Romania. It is composed of four villages: Băbuești, Dăești, Fedeleșoiu, and Sânbotin.

References

Communes in Vâlcea County
Localities in Muntenia